Hodbeh or Hadbeh may refer to:
 Hadbeh, Shadegan
 Hodbeh, Khanafereh
 Hadbeh, alternate name of Nahr-e Jadid